Hedenbergite, CaFeSi2O6, is the iron rich end member of the pyroxene group having a monoclinic crystal system. The mineral is extremely rarely found as a pure substance, and usually has to be synthesized in a lab.  It was named in 1819 after M.A. Ludwig Hedenberg, who was the first to define hedenbergite as a mineral.  Contact metamorphic rocks high in iron are the primary geologic setting for hedenbergite.  This mineral is unique because it can be found in chondrites and skarns (calc–silicate metamorphic rocks).  Since it is a member of the pyroxene family, there is a great deal of interest in its importance to general geologic processes.

Properties

Hedenbergite has a number of specific properties.  Its hardness is usually between five and six with two cleavage plains and conchoidal fracture.  Color varies between black, greenish black, and dark brown with a resinous luster.  Hedenbergite is a part of a pyroxene solid solution chain consisting of diopside and augite, and is the iron rich end member. One of the best indicators that you have located hedenbergite is the radiating prisms with a monoclinic crystal system. Hedenbergite is found primarily in metamorphic rocks.

Composition and structure

The pyroxene quadrilateral easily records the compositions of different pyroxenes contained in igneous rocks, such as diopside, hedenbergite, enstatite, ferrosilite. Hedenbergite is almost never found isolated. From the chemical formulas above, we can tell that the main differences in the compositions will be in terms of calcium, magnesium, and  iron.  D. H. Lindsley and J. L. Munoz (1969) did such an experiment in order to figure out exactly which combinations of temperature and pressure will cause particular minerals to combine. According to their experiment, at 1000 degrees with a pressure less than two kilobars the stable composition is a mixture of hedenbergite, olivine, and quartz. When the pressure moves to twenty kilobars, the composition moves towards the clinopyroxenes, which contains trace amounts of hedenbergite if any.  For temperatures of 750 degrees Celsius, the compositions move from hedenbergite with olivine and quartz to ferrosilite with a greater amount of hedenbergite.  If you combine the results of both of these sets of data, you can see that the stability of hedenbergite is more dependent on temperature as opposed to pressure.

Effects of chemical composition on elasticity
Pyroxenes are essential to the geologic processes that occur in the mantle and transition zones. One crystal was oriented with the C axis, and another perpendicular to the C axis.  The elastic strength of a polyhedron is determined by the cation occupying the central site. As the bond length of the cations and anions decreases the bond strength increases making the mineral more compact and dense. Substitution between ions like Ca2+ and Mg2+ would not have a great effect on the resistance to compression while substitution of Si4+ would make it much harder to compress.  Si4+ would be inherently stronger than Ca2+ due to the larger charge and electronegativity.

Occurrence in chondrites
Chondrites are meteorites that have experienced very little alteration by melting or differentiation since the formation of the Solar System 4.56 billion years ago.  One of the most studied chondrites in existence is the Allende meteorite.  Hedenbergite was found to be the most abundant secondary calcium-rich silicate phase within Allende chondules and is closely associated with other minerals such as sodalite and nepheline.  Kimura and Ikeda (1995) also suggest that hedenbergite formation may have been the result of the consumption of CaO and SiO2 as plagioclases decomposed into sodalite and nepheline as well as alkali-calcium exchange before the condrules' incorporation into the parent body.

Occurrence in skarns
Hedenbergite can be found in skarns.  A skarn is a metamorphic rock that is formed by the chemical alterations of the original minerals by hydrothermal causes.  They are formed by large chemical reactions between adjacent lithologies.  The Nickel Plate gold skarn deposit of the Hedley District in southern British Columbia is characterized by hedenbergitic pyroxene.

See also

 Classification of minerals
 List of minerals

References

Hashimoto A. and Grossman L. (1987) Alteration of Al-Rich Inclusions Inside Ameboid Olivine Aggregates Inside the Allende Meteorite. Geochemica Et Chosmochemica. Acta 51. pp. 1685–1704
Krot A. N., Scott E. R. D, and Zolensky M. E. (1995) Mineralogical and chemical modification of components in CV3 chondrites: Nebular or asteroidal processing? Meteoritics, Journal of Meteoritical Society. Vol 30. pp. 748–775
Farbe Minerals (2007) Ilvaite with Hedenbergite. www.webmineral.com/specimines/picshow.php?id=2801
Pilcher R. (1996) Geology and Fieldwork in Oman. Geology Today.Vol. 12 Issue 1. pp. 31–34
Wenk & Bulakh, (2006) Geos 306, Fall 2006, Lecture 12. http://www.geo.arizona.edu/xtal/geos306/fall06-12.htm

External links

Iron(II) minerals
Calcium minerals
Pyroxene group
Monoclinic minerals
Minerals in space group 15